The canton of Saint-Nazaire-2 is an administrative division of the Loire-Atlantique department, western France. It was created at the French canton reorganisation which came into effect in March 2015. Its seat is in Saint-Nazaire.

It consists of the following communes:
Besné
Donges
Montoir-de-Bretagne
Saint-Malo-de-Guersac
Saint-Nazaire (partly)
Trignac

References

Cantons of Loire-Atlantique